Petty Booka is a Japanese musical group that consists of two women, Petty and Booka, who sing and play ukulele.  Most of the band's early output consisted of cover versions of Hawaiian ukulele classics. The two also do many covers of well-known rock songs. Petty Booka was part of Sister Benten Online, a record company run by Audrey "Benten" Kimura.  The band is based in Japan, and has toured of Europe and North America.

In 1997, the original Petty left the duo, and a new Petty filled her spot. In November 2002, the original Booka also left to take care of her baby and was replaced by Candy Eyeslugger's Maiko.  The current "Petty" and "Booka" hail from Chiba and Saitama, Japan. 

The band has performed several times at the U.S. music festival SXSW as part of the Japan Nite event.

As of 2008, they are actively touring and recording. Petty Booka has previously toured with Bad Credit and The Aquabats.  Their next release will reportedly be a Bluegrass album.

Discography

Tokyo Bluegrass Honeys [Live] (Benten Tokyo/BNTN-069, 2008) 
Toconut's Hawaii (Ben Ten, ?)
Sweethearts of the Radio
Blue Lagoon
Hawaiian Pure Heart
Fujiyama Mama
Ukulele Lady
Singin' in the Rain (Vivid, 2001)
Dancing with Petty Booka (Benten Tokyo/Acg, 2006)
Summer Breeze (Crown, 2000)

References

External links
Petty Booka Website
Official Pettybooka Fan-Site
Interview at J-Pop World

Japanese pop music groups
Ukulele players